Risto Radunović (Montenegrin Cyrillic: Ристо Радуновић, ; born 4 May 1992) is a Montenegrin professional footballer who plays as a left-back for Liga I club FCSB and the Montenegro national team.

Club career
Born in the Montenegrin capital Podgorica, Radunović had been playing for 4 seasons with FK Budućnost Podgorica in the Montenegrin First League when, in summer 2014, he moved abroad and signed with FK Borac Čačak who had just made their return to the Serbian top-tier that summer.

International career
In May 2016, Radunović received a call up to the Montenegrin national team for a friendly against Turkey. He debuted as a substitute on October 14, 2018, in a UEFA Nations League away match against Lithuania, a 4–1 win.
On 1 September 2021 , he scored his first international goal dramatically for his team in 2022 FIFA World Cup qualification against  Turkey in 90+7 minute. He entered to game replaced by Zarko Tomasevic on 66th minute and he was a golden substitute for his team to help the  Montenegrin escape defeat.

Career statistics

Club
Statistics accurate as of match played 18 March 2023.

International

International goals
''Scores and results list Montenegro's goal tally first.

Honours
Budućnost Podgorica
 Prva CFL: 2011–12, 2016–17
 Montenegrin Cup: 2012–13

Astra Giurgiu
Cupa României runner-up: 2018–19

FCSB
Supercupa României runner-up: 2020

References

External links

 
 Risto Radunović stats at utakmica.rs 
 

1992 births
Living people
Footballers from Podgorica
Association football fullbacks
Montenegrin footballers
Montenegro youth international footballers
Montenegro under-21 international footballers
Montenegro international footballers
FK Budućnost Podgorica players
FK Borac Čačak players
FC Astra Giurgiu players
FC Steaua București players
Montenegrin First League players
Serbian SuperLiga players
Liga I players
Montenegrin expatriate footballers
Expatriate footballers in Serbia
Montenegrin expatriate sportspeople in Serbia
Expatriate footballers in Romania
Montenegrin expatriate sportspeople in Romania